The Mitsubishi SUW (Smart Utility Wagon) is a series of concept cars sharing a common design theme, and first exhibited by Japanese automaker Mitsubishi Motors at the 1999 Frankfurt and Tokyo Motor Shows.

The Smart Utility Wagon theme was introduced late in 1998 as a demonstration of the company's corporate slogan of the time, "Innovation in Motion", which was itself to represent "smart design" and "ecology conscious[ness]". Specifically, SUWs shared the company's gasoline direct injection (GDI) engine technology, a taller roofline for easier entry and exit, and interior space competitive with larger vehicles. The three individual vehicles Mitsubishi produced were the SUW Advance, a five-door hatchback family car, the SUW Compact a three-door hatchback small car, and the SUW Active sport utility vehicle.

SUW Advance
The SUW Advance hatchback was designed with accommodation for five adults and high fuel economy as its highest priorities. The car was powered by a  GDI-HEV hybrid electric powertrain; a 1.5-litre internal combustion engine using gasoline direct injection and an array of lithium ion batteries, mated to a continuously variable transmission.

SUW Compact
The SUW Compact was designed for urban environments, so compactness and manoeuvrability were prioritised alongside fuel economy. The powertrain also utilised GDI technology, this time as a  1.1-litre with ASG (Automatic Stop-Go), a system which turns off the engine when it is idling and restarts it on demand.

SUW Active
The SUW Active did not appear alongside its siblings at Frankfurt, debuting instead in Tokyo in October. Another GDI powertrain was used, this time fitted with a turbocharger.

Notes

Suw